This is a list of the extreme points and extreme elevations in Russia.

The northernmost and easternmost points of Russia coincide with those of Eurasia (both for the mainland and including the islands).

The other extreme points of Russia are the same as those of the Soviet Union.

Extreme coordinates
Including islands and exclaves

Northernmost point — Cape Fligely, Franz Josef Land, Arkhangelsk Oblast
Southernmost point — near Ragdan, Republic of Dagestan
Westernmost point — Narmeln, Vistula Spit, Kaliningrad Oblast
Easternmost point1 — Big Diomede Island, Chukotka Autonomous Okrug

Contiguous mainland only
Northernmost point — Cape Chelyuskin, Krasnoyarsk Krai (77°43'N)
Southernmost point — Ragdan, Republic of Dagestan (41°12'N)
Westernmost point — near Lavry, Pskov Oblast (27°19'E)
Easternmost point1 — Cape Dezhnev (East Cape), Chukotka Autonomous Okrug (169°40'W)

Towns and cities

Northernmost — Pevek, Chukotka Autonomous Okrug (69°42′N)
Southernmost — Derbent, Republic of Dagestan (42°04′N)
Westernmost — Baltiysk, Kaliningrad Oblast (19°55′E)
Easternmost — Anadyr, Chukotka Autonomous Okrug (177°30′E)

Permanent settlements
Northernmost — Dikson (73°30′N)
Southernmost — Kurush, Republic of Dagestan (41°16′N)
Westernmost — Baltiysk, Kaliningrad Oblast (19°55′E)
Easternmost1 — Uelen, Chukotka Autonomous Okrug (169°48′W)

1according to the path of the International Date Line, although being located in the Western Hemisphere.

Elevation extremes

Lowest point: Caspian Sea level: 
Highest point: west summit of Mount Elbrus: 
Highest active volcano of Eurasia: Klyuchevskaya Sopka:

See also
Extreme points of Earth
Geography of Russia

Geography of Russia
Russia
Extreme